Michael Petersen (born 6 May 1965) is an Australian former soccer player. He is an inductee of the Football Federation Australia - Football Hall of Fame.

Playing career

Club career
Petersen played for Heidelberg United, Brunswick and South Melbourne in Australia, as well as in the Netherlands with Roda JC and Ajax.

He played nine seasons with South Melbourne between 1989 and 1997, winning the NSL Championship in 1991.

International career
In all Petersen represented Australia 50 times including 32 A International matches.

References

1965 births
Living people
Australian soccer players
Australian expatriate soccer players
Australia international soccer players
Australia B international soccer players
Australian expatriate sportspeople in the Netherlands
Expatriate footballers in the Netherlands
Eredivisie players
Port Melbourne SC players
AFC Ajax players
Brunswick Juventus players
South Melbourne FC players
National Soccer League (Australia) players
Footballers at the 1988 Summer Olympics
Olympic soccer players of Australia
South Melbourne FC managers
Association football midfielders
Australian soccer coaches
Soccer players from Melbourne